Chris Enochs is a former Minor League Baseball pitcher.

Career
Enochs played baseball for the West Virginia University Mountaineers. In 1996, he played collegiate summer baseball with the Falmouth Commodores of the Cape Cod Baseball League. Enochs was selected 11th overall in the 1997 Major League Baseball draft by the Oakland Athletics.  He played for several minor league teams from 1997 through 2005.

Personal life
He is married and has two daughters.

References

American baseball players
Living people
1975 births
West Virginia Mountaineers baseball players
Falmouth Commodores players
All-American college baseball players
Southern Oregon Timberjacks players
Modesto A's players
Huntsville Stars players
Visalia Oaks players
Midland RockHounds players
Sacramento River Cats players
New Orleans Zephyrs players
Indianapolis Indians players
People from New Cumberland, West Virginia